Pitman is a surname. Notable people with the surname include:

 Almira Hollander Pitman (1854-1939), American suffragist
 Andrew Pitman, Australian climate scientist
 Benjamin Pitman, promoter of Pitman's shorthand in the United States
 Benjamin Pitman (Hawaii judge), New England and Hawaiian businessman
 Bill Pitman, American guitarist and session musician
 Charles Pitman (game warden) (1890–1975), British herpetologist and ornithologist 
 Charles H. Pitman (born 1935), American Marine Corps general
 Chris Pitman, synthist for the U.S. band Guns N' Roses
 Brett Pitman, professional footballer for Bournemouth, Bristol City, Ipswich Town and Portsmouth.
 E.J.G. Pitman, statistician noted for the Pitman–Koopman–Darmois theorem concerning exponential families of probability distributions
 Frederick Pitman, British Olympic rower
 Frederick I Pitman, British rower and Boat Race umpire (father of Frederick)
Gayle E. Pitman, American author
 Henry Alfred Pitman (1808–1908), English physician
 Henry Hoʻolulu Pitman (1845–1863), American Civil War soldier of Native Hawaiian ancestry
 Herbert Pitman, third officer on the RMS Titanic
 Isaac Pitman, inventor of Pitman Shorthand
 Jacob Pitman, brother of Isaac, brought shorthand and Swedenborgianism to South Australia
 James Pitman, inventor of the Initial Teaching Alphabet
 Jenny Pitman, British racehorse trainer and author
 Kent Pitman, expert on Lisp programming language
 Marie J. Davis Pitman (1850–1888), American author who used the pen-name "Margery Deane"
 Mary Pitman Ailau, Hawaiian noblewomen
 MC Pitman, East Midlands English rapper
 Primrose Pitman (1902-1998), English artist
 Robert Carter Pitman, 19th century Massachusetts legislator and author
 Rose M. M. Pitman (1868-1947), English illustrator
 Walter Pitman, educator and former politician in Ontario, Canada
 Walter C. Pitman, III, geophysicist and a professor emeritus at Columbia University

Occupational surnames